Kurdasht may refer to:

 Kurdasht-e Olya
 Kurdasht-e Sofla